Ron Rhine was a member of the Ohio House of Representatives from 1999–2002.  His district encompassed portions of Clark County, Ohio, which is the home of Springfield, Ohio.  He was succeeded by Chris Widener, when his district was redrawn to become more conservative.  
Ron Rhine wins primary election 
Governor can be grateful for Tressel

Republican Party members of the Ohio House of Representatives
Living people
21st-century American politicians
Year of birth missing (living people)